Uterine artery embolization is a procedure in which an interventional radiologist uses a catheter to deliver small particles that block the blood supply to the uterine body. The procedure is done for the treatment of uterine fibroids and adenomyosis. This minimally invasive procedure is commonly used in the treatment of uterine fibroids and is also called uterine fibroid embolization.

Medical uses
Uterine artery embolization is used to treat bothersome bulk-related symptoms or abnormal or heavy uterine bleeding due to uterine fibroids or for the treatment of adenomyosis.  Fibroid size, number, and location are three potential predictors of a successful outcome.

Long-term patient satisfaction outcomes are similar to that of surgery. There is tentative evidence that traditional surgery may result in better fertility. Uterine artery embolization also appears to require more repeat procedures than if surgery was done initially.

It has shorter recovery times. Uterine artery embolization is thought to work because uterine fibroids have abnormal vasculature together with aberrant responses to hypoxia (inadequate oxygenation to tissues).

Uterine artery embolization can also be used to control heavy uterine bleeding for reasons other than fibroids, such as postpartum obstetrical hemorrhage. and adenomyosis.

According to the American Journal of Gynecology, uterine artery embolization costs 12% less than hysterectomy and 8% less than myomectomy.

Adverse effects
The rate of serious complications is comparable to that of myomectomy or hysterectomy. The advantage of somewhat faster recovery time is offset by a higher rate of minor complications and an increased likelihood of requiring surgical intervention within two to five years of the initial procedure.

Complications include the following:
 Death from embolism, or sepsis (the presence of pus-forming or other pathogenic organisms, or their toxins, in the blood or tissues) resulting in multiple organ failure 
 Infection from tissue death of fibroids, leading to endometritis (infection of the uterus) resulting in lengthy hospitalization for administration of intravenous antibiotics 
 Misembolization from microspheres or polyvinyl alcohol particles flowing or drifting into organs or tissues where they were not intended to be, causing damage to other organs or other parts of the body such as ovaries, bladder, rectum, and rarely small bowel, uterus, vagina, and labia.
 Loss of ovarian function, infertility, and loss of orgasm
 Failure – continued fibroid growth, regrowth within four months
 Menopause – iatrogenic, abnormal, cessation of menstruation and follicle stimulating hormones elevated to menopausal levels 
 Post-embolization syndrome – characterized by acute and/or chronic pain, fevers, malaise, nausea, vomiting and severe night sweats;  foul vaginal odor coming from infected, necrotic tissue which remains inside the uterus;  hysterectomy due to infection, pain or failure of embolization
 Severe, persistent pain, resulting in the need for morphine or synthetic narcotics 
 Hematoma, blood clot at the incision site; vaginal discharge containing pus and blood, bleeding from incision site, bleeding from vagina, fibroid expulsion (fibroids pushing out through the vagina), unsuccessful fibroid expulsion (fibroids trapped in the cervix causing infection and requiring surgical removal), life-threatening allergic reaction to the contrast material, and uterine adhesions

Procedure 
The procedure is performed by an interventional radiologist under conscious sedation. Access is commonly through the radial or femoral artery via the wrist or groin, respectively. After anesthetizing the skin over the artery of choice, the artery is accessed by a needle puncture using Seldinger technique.  An access sheath and guidewire are then introduced into the artery.  In order to select the uterine vessels for subsequent embolization, a guiding catheter is commonly used and placed into the uterine artery under X-ray fluoroscopy guidance.  Once at the level of the uterine artery an angiogram with contrast is performed to confirm placement of the catheter and the embolizing agent (spheres or beads) is released. Blood flow to the fibroid will slow significantly or cease altogether, causing the fibroid to shrink. This process can be repeated for as many arteries as are supplying the fibroid.  This is done bilaterally from the initial puncture site as unilateral uterine artery embolizations have a high risk of failure.  With both uterine arteries occluded, abundant collateral circulation prevents uterine necrosis, and the fibroids decrease in size and vascularity as they receive the bulk of the embolization material. The procedure can be performed in a hospital, surgical center or office setting and commonly take no longer than an hour to perform.  Post-procedurally if access was gained via a femoral artery puncture an occlusion device can be used to hasten healing of the puncture site and the patient is asked to remain with the leg extended for several hours but many patients are discharged the same day with some remaining in the hospital for a single day admission for pain control and observation.  If access was gained via the radial artery the patient will be able to get off the table and walk out immediately following the procedure. The procedure is not a surgical intervention, and allows the uterus to be kept in place, avoiding many of the associated surgical complications.

References

External links
http://www.merciafibroidclinic.com/
Informational resource to help understand uterine fibroids and minimally invasive treatment options, Uterine Fibroid Embolization

Interventional radiology
Anatomical pathology
Obstetrical and gynaecological procedures